The risk of mortality (ROM) provides a medical classification to estimate the likelihood of inhospital death for a patient. The ROM classes are minor, moderate, major, and extreme. The ROM class is used for the evaluation of patient mortality.

See also
 Case mix index
 Diagnosis codes
 Severity of illness

References
 Alemi, F., J. Rice, and R. Hankins. 1990. "Predicting In-Hospital Survival of Myocardial Infarction." Medical Care 28 (9): 762–75. 
 Averill, R. F., J. H. Muldoon, J. C. Vertrees, N. I. Goldfield, R. L. Mullin, E. C. Fineran, M. Z. Zhang, B. Steinbeck, and T. Grant, The Evolution of Casemix Measurement Using Diagnosis Related Groups (DRGs) 3M HIS Working Paper. Wallinford, CT: 3M Health Information Systems, 1997
 Iezzoni, L. I., M. Shwartz, A. S. Ash, J. S. Hughes, J. Daley, and Y. D. Mackiernan, Severity Measurement Methods and Judging Hospital Death Rates for Pneumonia, Medical Care 34 (1): 11–28, 1996

Medical terminology
Medical manuals
Diagnosis classification
Medical scales